Leskov Island is an ice-covered island in the West Ice Shelf of Antarctica, rising to ,  northwest of Mikhaylov Island. It was discovered by the First Russian Antarctic Expedition of 1819–21, and named after Lieutenant Leskov, one of the members of that expedition.

References

Islands of Princess Elizabeth Land